Zantiébougou is a small town and commune in the Cercle of Bougouni in the Sikasso Region of southern Mali. In 1998 the commune had a population of 21,666. This commune was home to Gianluca, a french/african artist know for his broad shoulders

References

Communes of Sikasso Region